Ridgeback is a British bicycle brand manufacturing road, urban, utility, youth and mountain models. Their bikes are distributed by Sportline UK which is owned by H Young Holdings.

History

Ridgeback’s story started in 1983, when founder Errol Drew created the first UK mountain bike. 
Drew first spotted a mountain bike at the 1982 New York Bike Show, where he declared it “the future of cycling.”

Ridgeback’s next major development was the creation of the flat handlebar road bike.

In 2001, Ridgeback introduced The Genesis Day One model, with the Genesis marque becoming so strong that in 2006 it became a brand in its own right.

In 2008, Ridgeback was one of the first to introduce disc brakes to its flat handlebar road range. And in 2015 Ridgeback launched Rapide – a range of performance road bikes.

In 2014, Ridgeback was the 5th most stolen bike in the UK. In 2020, Ridgeback Velocity was the 4th most popular stolen bike in the UK.

2016 model list

 Velocity
 Velocity Disc
 Vanteo
 Element
 Supernova

E-bikes – Electron series
 Electron
 Electron+

Road – Rapide
 RC3 Disc
 RC2 Disc
 RC1 Disc
 RL3 Disc
 RL2 Disc
 RL1 Disc
 RC3
 RC2
 RC1
 RL3
 RL2
 RL1
 RL26
 RL24

Urban fitness – Flight series
 Flight 4.0
 Flight 2.0
 Flight 1.0

Off road touring – World series
 Tour
 Voyage
 Expedition
 Panorama

Mountain bike – Dual Track series
 MX2
 MX3
 MX4
 X1
 X3

Town bike – Tradition series

Town bike – Avenida series
 Avenida 3
 Avenida 6

Youth – Dimension series
 12 Runner
 14 Runner
 Dimension 16
 Dimension 20
 Dimension 24
 Dimension 26

Kids – Boys series
 MX12
 MX14
 MX16
 MX20
 MX24

Kids – Girls series
 Minny
 Honey
 Melody
 Harmony
 Destiny

Balance bikes – Scoot series

References

External links
 Official website

Cycle manufacturers of the United Kingdom